Ulrich Jansen (5  June 1931 - 19 July 2006) was a professional ice hockey player. He represented the United Team of Germany in the 1956, 1960, and 1964 Winter Olympics.

References

External links
 

1931 births
2006 deaths
German ice hockey goaltenders
Ice hockey players at the 1956 Winter Olympics
Ice hockey players at the 1960 Winter Olympics
Ice hockey players at the 1964 Winter Olympics
Olympic ice hockey players of Germany
Olympic ice hockey players of the United Team of Germany
Sportspeople from Krefeld